The 2014–15 Northern Colorado Bears men's basketball team represented the University of Northern Colorado during the 2014–15 NCAA Division I men's basketball season. The Bears were led by fifth year head coach B. J. Hill and played their home games at the Bank of Colorado Arena. They were a member of the Big Sky Conference. They finished the season 15–15, 10–8 in Big Sky play to finish in fifth place. They lost in the quarterfinals of the Big Sky tournament to Northern Arizona. The Bears weren't invited to a postseason tournament.

Roster

Schedule

|-
!colspan=9 style="background:#000066; color:#FFCC33;"| Exhibition

|-
!colspan=9 style="background:#000066; color:#FFCC33;"| Regular season

|-
!colspan=9 style="background:#000066; color:#FFCC33;"| Big Sky tournament

References

Northern Colorado Bears men's basketball seasons
Northern Colorado
Northern Colorado Bears men's basketball
Northern Colorado Bears men's basketball